Liam Casey (born 1995) is an Irish Gaelic footballer who plays as a centre-forward for the Tipperary senior team.

Born in Cahir, County Tipperary, Casey first played competitive Gaelic football during his schooling at Rockwell College. He arrived on the inter-county scene at the age of seventeen when he first linked up with the Tipperary minor team before later joining the under-21 side. He made his senior debut during the 2015 championship. Casey immediately became a regular member of the starting fifteen.

At club level Casey plays with Cahir

On 22 November 2020, Tipperary won the 2020 Munster Senior Football Championship after a 0-17 to 0-14 win against Cork in the final. It was Tipperary's first Munster title in 85 years.

Honours

Player

Tipperary
Munster Under-21 Football Championship (1): 2015
National Football League Division 3 (1): 2017
Munster Senior Football Championship (1): 2020

References

1995 births
Living people
Cahir Gaelic footballers
Tipperary inter-county Gaelic footballers